The Bangladesh Handball Federation (BHF) is the governing body of handball and beach handball in the People's Republic of Bangladesh. Founded in 1983, BHF is affiliated to the International Handball Federation and Asian Handball Federation. BHF is also affiliated to the Bangladesh Olympic Association and South Asian Handball Federation. It is based in Dhaka.

History

Handball game was launched in Bangladesh in 1982 under the leadership of the then vice-president of National Sports Control Board and president of Bangladesh Handball Federation MA Hamid. The then assistant director of National Sports Council, Siddiqur Rahman Munshi, and the general secretary, Asaduzzaman Kohinoor, were the facilitators for the overall management.

Hamid, organized a founding congress of BHF on 30 September 1983 along with some of the most prominent sports organizer and benevolent. The meeting was held at the office of the then DCMLA Secretariat (Present Prime Minister's Office) and was chaired by the Chief of Naval Staff Rear Admiral Mahbub Ali Khan. Under the leadership of Rear Admiral Mahbub Ali Khan an ad-hock committee was formed with him as chief patron, Hamid as president, General Secretary Ali Akbar, Joint Secretary Asaduzzaman Kohinoor.

On 1 May 1984, BHF received formal recognition by the then National Sports Control Board. BHF being incorporated with Asian Handball Federation, by their affiliation in 1985. The International Handball Federation (IHF), also given the affiliation in 1986, Commonwealth Handball Association in 1990 and South Asian Handball Federation incorporated as an affiliate member in 1995.

National teams
 Bangladesh men's national handball team
 Bangladesh men's national junior handball team
 Bangladesh men's national youth handball team
 Bangladesh women's national handball team
 Bangladesh women's national junior handball team
 Bangladesh women's national youth handball team

Competitions hosted
 2000 Asian Women's Junior Handball Championship
 2010 South Asian Games

References

External links
 Official website
 Bangladesh Handball Federation at IHF site

Members
1983 establishments in Bangladesh
Handball
Sports organizations established in 1983
Handball governing bodies
Handball in Bangladesh